Our Lady of Zeitoun, also known simply as El-Zeitoun, Zeitun or rarely Our Lady of Light, was a mass Marian apparition that was reported to have occurred in the Zeitoun district of Cairo, Egypt, during a period of about 3 years beginning on 2 April 1968.

Apparition
The first apparition of the Virgin Mary at Zeitoun was recorded on the evening of 2 April 1968. The phenomenon was seen by two Muslim bus mechanics, who claimed to witness a woman dressed in white on the roof of Saint Mary's Coptic Church. One thought she was a nun about to attempt suicide by leaping from the roof, and called for police. Intrigued by the mechanics yelling "don't jump!", a crowd gathered at the site. The police attempted to disperse them, saying that the sighting was just a reflection of the light from the street lamps. However, a church custodian suggested the figure was the Virgin Mary, which greatly excited the crowd. The event itself ended after a few minutes.

One week later, on 9 April, the phenomenon reoccurred, again lasting for only a few minutes. After that time apparitions became more frequent, sometimes two or three times a week, for several years, ending in 1971. According to Coptic tradition, Zeitoun is near one of the locations where the Holy Family stayed during their flight into Egypt.

The patriarch of the Coptic Orthodox Church of Alexandria, Pope Kyrillos VI appointed a committee of high-ranking priests and bishops to investigate the matter, directed by Bishop Gregorios, bishop of postgraduate studies, Coptic culture and scientific research. On 4 May Pope Kyrillos VI issued an official statement confirming the apparitions. Soon afterward, the Ministry of Tourism also issued a validation of the sightings, and began printing pamphlets.

Nuns of the Society of the Sacred Heart also witnessed the apparitions and sent a detailed report to the Vatican, resulting in the arrival of an envoy on 28 April who also saw the apparitions and sent a report to Pope Paul VI. As the apparition appeared over a Coptic church, the Vatican left the investigation to the Coptic authorities.

The apparitions were also allegedly witnessed by President Gamal Abdel Nasser, and images photographed by newspaper photographers and Egyptian television. Investigations performed by the police could find no apparent explanation. No device was found within a radius of fifteen miles capable of projecting the image, and many photos were taken of the alleged apparition by independent photographers. With no alternative explanation and approval from religious and political official, the Egyptian government accepted the apparitions as true.

Skeptical response

Estimates of the number of observers of the event vary greatly. Thousands were said to have flocked to the Church soon after the first announced occurrences of the phenomenon. Christian author Francis Johnston claims the apparitions were seen by a total of millions of people. Primary sources used by Johnston put 250,000 as the upper limit for a single night, though the difficulty in estimating crowd size in the dark means the number of people in the crowd may have been significantly larger or smaller.

The only secular, English-language account of the events was provided by Cynthia Nelson, a professor of anthropology at the American University in Cairo. She visited the church site on several occasions including 15 April 1968, another week later near the end of April, and on 1 June 1968. Despite reports of regular appearances of the Virgin Mary, Nelson did not see anything that could be identified clearly as such. Instead she only saw a few 'intermittent flashes of light' and later, a glow of ambiguous shape shining through palm trees. "But", she admitted, "the source of the light was a mystery, for the streetlights had been disconnected all around the church for several days."

Some authors suggest that the sightings must be considered in context. The appearances happened during a period of crisis in Egyptian history and echoed "a widespread feeling that the defeat of Egypt in the 1967 Arab-Israeli war was the result of having abandoned faith in favor of human-made ideas and belief systems". Sociologists Robert Bartholomew and Erich Goode offer the Zeitoun apparitions as a prominent case of mass hysteria: “It appears that the Marian observers were predisposed by religious background and social expectation to interpreting the light displays as related to the Virgin Mary.”

Professor Michael P. Carroll similarly suggests that the "lights of uncertain origin" were interpreted as Mary due to the societal stresses on Egyptian society at the time, coupled with an association of the Virgin Mary with the Zeitoun area. Carroll notes that Muslims seeing the Virgin wouldn't be unusual, as Mary is revered in Islam as well.

John S. Derr and Michael A. Persinger propose a possible cause of the lights themselves in Tectonic Strain Theory, the idea that the occurrence of earthquakes causes the appearance of strange lights. Indeed, Zeitoun did see some tectonic activity prior to the events of 1968-1971. Therefore, the source of the lights could have been a by-product of this seismic activity. Appearances of the lights only at night would be possible as such lights might not be visible during daytime; however, Tectonic Strain Theory has yet to provide a mechanism for how tectonic events could cause these lights.

Photos of the event are numerous, though sometimes inconsistent. Most of the photos are blurry or of poor quality, though some do seem to show the Virgin Mary regardless. One of them is either an illustration over a less detailed photo, or a complete illustration, depending on the source. The sourcing for the most popular photo is unclear, and some skeptics have mentioned inconsistencies such as the bright sunlight on the onlookers heads, while the sky looks black, or the apparition seeming translucent despite other photographs and witness testimony describing it as opaque and very bright. In Cynthia Nelson's report, she noted that many photos and pictures of the apparition were being sold in the marketplace, which could add a financial incentive for forgery.

Skeptoid podcast produced an episode about the apparition. They criticized Persinger's Tectonic Strain Theory, noting that many of the so-called earthquake lights are completely explicable, such as lightning from distant storms or transformers exploding as a result of earthquake. They argue that the photographs are either suspiciously illustration-looking or do not show a human figure, and say that many drawings were hawked in the marketplace as souvenirs. The podcast concludes with a proposed explanation of the events: lights of uncertain origin were interpreted as the Virgin Mary because of societal stressors and local tradition.

Golden Jubilee
On 12 May 2018, the Coptic Church celebrated the golden Jubilee of the event. A large number of priests and Christians from all over Egypt attended the celebration. Sub-celebrations have been held from 10 May to 13 May.

See also
Church of the Virgin Mary (Zeitoun)
Our Lady of Warraq
Our Lady of Assiut
Our Lady of Fatima
Coptic Orthodox Church

References

Further reading
Pearl Zaki (1977). Our Lord's Mother visits Egypt in 1968 & 1969. Publisher Dar el Alam el Arabi. Available online
Francis Johnston (1980). When Millions Saw Mary. Augustine Publishing Co.  also available online
Youssef G. Kamell/ John P. Jackson/ Rebecca S. Jackson (1996): A Lady of Light Appears in Egypt. The story of Zeitoun. St. Mark's Avenue Press.
Père Francois Brune (2004): La Vièrge de l'Egypte. L'incroyable apparition de Marie à des millions d'Egyptiens. Editions Le jardin des Livres.
Articles "Caire III - Caire X", in: Laurentin, René / Sbalchiero, Patrick (eds.)(2007): Dictionnaire des "apparitions" de la Vierge Marie. Fayard.

External links
Marian apparitions of Zeitoun Memorial

1968 in Africa
Zeitoun
Coptic Orthodox Church
1968 in Egypt
Zeitoun